The Adair Viaduct is a historic structure located in Adair, Iowa, United States. In 1908 Adair County built the first bridge at this location over the Chicago, Rock Island and Pacific Railroad tracks near the site of the 1873 Jesse James train robbery. Increased traffic by the 1920s necessitated its replacement. The Iowa State Highway Commission designed the three-span open spandrel arch bridge. The Adair County Board of Supervisors awarded the $42,263 to build the bridge to the Federal Bridge Company of Des Moines. It is somewhat unusual in Iowa in that the bridge is not symmetrical. The bridge was opened to traffic in June 1924. It was listed on the National Register of Historic Places in 1998.

References

Bridges completed in 1924
Transportation buildings and structures in Adair County, Iowa
National Register of Historic Places in Adair County, Iowa
Road bridges on the National Register of Historic Places in Iowa
Arch bridges in Iowa
Open-spandrel deck arch bridges in the United States
1924 establishments in Iowa